James or Jim Fuller may refer to:

Athletes
 James Fuller (American football) (born 1969), American football player and coach
 James Fuller (cricketer, born 1990), New Zealand cricketer, played for Otago, Gloucestershire, Auckland and Middlesex
 James Fuller (Rhodesian cricketer) (1916–1976), Rhodesian cricketer, played for Rhodesia and Transvaal 1935–48
 Jim Fuller (American football) (1945–2021), American college football player and coach, college athletics administrator
 Jim Fuller (outfielder) (born 1950), former Major League Baseball outfielder for the Houston Astros
 Jim Fuller (footballer) (born 1943), Australian rules footballer
 Jimmy Fuller (1892–1987), American baseball player

Others
 James Fuller (automobile executive) (1938–1988), U.S. automobile executive
 James Franklin Fuller (1835–1924), Irish actor, architect and novelist
 James W. Fuller III (1873–1929), American industrial heir
 James W. Fuller Jr. (1843–1910), American industrialist
 Jim Fuller (musician) (1947–2017), American musician and member of The Surfaris
 James A. Fuller, British army officer and architect